The 2019 ITTF Challenge Series is the third season of the International Table Tennis Federation's secondary professional table tennis tour, a level below the ITTF World Tour. From this season, the ITTF Challenge Series will be split into two tiers: Challenge Plus and Challenge.

Schedule

The tournaments in the 2019 tour have been split into two tiers: Challenge Plus and Challenge.

Below is the 2019 schedule announced by the International Table Tennis Federation:

Key

Winners
Key

See also
2019 World Table Tennis Championships
2019 ITTF World Tour

References

External links
International Table Tennis Federation
2019 ITTF Challenge Series

 
ITTF Challenge Series
Challenge Series